Prehistoric Women may refer to:
 Prehistoric Women (1950 film), a low-budget fantasy adventure film
 Prehistoric Women (1967 film), a British fantasy adventure film